Slivnica pri Mariboru is a settlement in the Municipality of Hoče–Slivnica in northeastern Slovenia. It lies under the eastern Pohorje Hills on the edge of the flatlands on the right bank of the Drava River south of Maribor. The A1 Motorway runs through the settlement and a major interchange with the A4 motorway is located just north of the settlement. The area is part of the traditional region of Lower Styria. The municipality is now included in the Drava Statistical Region.

The local parish church is dedicated to the Nativity of Mary and belongs to the Roman Catholic Archdiocese of Maribor. It has a Romanesque nave dating to the 11th century and an early 16th-century Gothic sanctuary and belfry.

References

External links

Slivnica pri Mariboru on Geopedia

Populated places in the Municipality of Hoče-Slivnica